Kahloke can refer to:

SS Asbury Park, later renamed Kahloke
MV Kahloke, the current ship with that name